East Fallowfield Township is the name of some places in the U.S. state of Pennsylvania:
East Fallowfield Township, Chester County, Pennsylvania
East Fallowfield Township, Crawford County, Pennsylvania

See also:
Fallowfield Township, Pennsylvania
West Fallowfield Township, Pennsylvania (disambiguation)

Pennsylvania township disambiguation pages